The Maudheim medal (Maudheimmedaljen) was instituted by King Haakon VII of Norway on 14 November 1951 in honor of the members of the Norwegian-British-Swedish Antarctic Expedition of 1949–1952, awarded to the participants of the expedition.  This expedition was the first to Antarctica involving an international team of scientists. During the expedition, a base known as Maudheim was established on the Quar Ice Shelf along the coast of Queen Maud Land in February 1950. The medal itself is the same as the King's Medal of Merit in Silver with the addition of a silver buckle on the ribbon with the inscription "MAUDHEIM 1949-1952". Only 18 people were awarded with the Maudheim Medal.

Recipients

Norwegian
John Schjelderup Giæver
Nils Roer
Nils Jørgen Schumacher
Egil Gunnar Rogstad
Peter Jul Melleby
Bjarne Lorentzen

Swedish
Stig Valter Schytt
Gösta Hjalmar Liljequist
Stig Eugen Hallgren
Paul Ove Wilson
Bertil Ekström (Post Mortem)

British
Gordon de Quetteville Robin
Charles Winthrop Molesworth Swithinbank
Alan Williams Reece
Ernest Frederik Roots
John Ellis Jelbart (Post Mortem)
Leslie Arthur Quar (Post Mortem)

See also
 Orders, decorations, and medals of Norway

References

External links
Page for the Norwegian Maudheim medal

Orders, decorations, and medals of Norway
Awards for polar exploration
Awards established in 1951
1951 establishments in Norway